Archer Maclean's Pool is a video game by Archer Maclean, published by Virgin Games in 1992 for Amiga, Atari ST and MS-DOS.

Gameplay
The sequel of sorts to Jimmy White's 'Whirlwind' Snooker, the game replaces the snooker theme of the predecessor game with that of pool.

Reception

See also
 Jimmy White's 'Whirlwind' Snooker

References

External links
 Archer Maclean's Pool at Lemon Amiga
 

1992 video games
Amiga games
Atari ST games
Cue sports video games
DOS games
Multiplayer and single-player video games
Virgin Interactive games
Video games developed in the United Kingdom